This is a list of American hip-hop musicians from New York City, New York.

0–9
 2Pac
 3rd Bass
 4th Disciple
 40 Cal.
 50 Cent
 6ix9ine.
 60 Second Assassin
 88-Keys
 9th Prince

A
 A.D.O.R.
 A Boogie wit da Hoodie
 A Tribe Called Quest
 Aasim
 Action Bronson
 Ad-Rock
 Aesop Rock
 Afrika Baby Bam
 Afrika Bambaataa
 Afu-Ra
 Agallah
 Akinyele
 AKTHESAVIOR
 Ali Dee Theodore
 Ali Shaheed Muhammad
 All City
 Amil
 Andy Mineo
 Angie Martinez
 ANTHM
 Antoinette
 A$AP Ferg
 A$AP Mob
 A$AP Nast
 A$AP Rocky
 A$AP Twelvyy
 A$AP TyY
 A$AP Yams
 Ashok Kondabolu
 Astro
 Audio Two
 Awkwafina
 Awon
 AZ
 Azealia Banks

B
 Bas
 The Beastie Boys
 Beatnuts
 Big Ali
 Big Bank Hank
 Big Body Bes
 Big Daddy Kane
 Big L
 Big Noyd
 Big Pun
 Big Tigger
 Bigg Jus
 Bishop Nehru
 Biz Markie
 Black Market Militia
 Black Moon
 Black Rob
 Black Sheep
 Black Star
 Blaq Poet
 Blinky Blink
 Bobby Shmurda
 Bodega Bamz
 The Bomb Squad
 Boogie Down Productions
 Boot Camp Clik
 Brand Nubian
 Breez Evahflowin'
 Bronx Style Bob
 Brother J
 Buckshot
 Buckwild
 Buff Love
 Busta Rhymes
 Busy Bee Starski

C
 C-Rayz Walz
 Cage
 Cam'ron
 Camp Lo
 Canibus
 Cannibal Ox
 Capital STEEZ
 Capone
 Cappadonna
 Cardi B
 Caushun
 Ced-Gee
 Cella Dwellas
 Channel Live
 Charles Hamilton
 Chaundon
 Cheno Lyfe
 Chi Ali
 Children of the Corn
 Chinx
 Chris Rolle
 Christopher Martin
 Christopher Reid
(group)|City Morgue]] 
 Chubb Rock
 Chuck D
 CJ Fly
 CL Smooth
 Coke La Rock
 Conceited
 Consequence
 Cool Calm Pete
 Cormega
 Cory Gunz
 Craig G
 Craig Mack
 Crooklyn Dodgers
 Cuban Link

D
 D.M.C.
 D-Nice
 Da Beatminerz
 Da Bush Babees
 Da King & I
 Daddy-O
 Dai Burger
 Dana Dane
 Danny Boy
 Das EFX
 Das Racist
 Dave East
 David Stones
 Davy DMX
 De La Soul
 dead prez
 Deadly Venoms
 Def Jef
 Def Squad
 Desiigner
 Diamond D
 Digable Planets
 Diggin' in the Crates Crew
 Diggy Simmons
 The Diplomats
 Disco King Mario
 DJ Clue?
 DJ Cocoa Chanelle
 DJ Envy
 DJ Green Lantern
 DJ Hurricane
 DJ Kay Slay
 DJ Lord
 DJ Muggs
 DJ Richie Rich
 DJ Scratch
 DJ Skribble
 DJ Spinderella
 DJ Spinna
 DJ Subroc
 DJ Whoo Kid
 DMX
 Donny Goines
 Doug E. Fresh
 Dr. Jeckyll & Mr. Hyde
 Drag-On
 Dres
 Duke Bootee
 DukeDaGod
 Dyme-A-Duzin

E
 E.D.I. Mean
 Ed Lover
 El-P
 Emilio Rojas
 EPMD
 Eric B. & Rakim
 Eric Booker
 Erick Arc Elliott
 Erick Sermon
 Everlast

F
 Fab Five Freddy
 Fabolous
 The Fat Boys
 Fat Joe
 Father MC
 The Firm
 Fivio Foreign
 Flatbush ZOMBiES
 Flatlinerz
 Flava Flav
 Flipp Dinero
 Flowsik
 Foxy Brown
 Freaky Tah
 Freddie Foxxx
 Fredro Starr
 Freekey Zekey
 French Montana
 Frenchie
 Fu-Schnickens
 Funky 4 + 1

G
 G. Dep
 G-Unit
 Gang Starr
 Gary G-Wiz
 Gawvi
 Ghostface Killah
 Godfather Don
 GP Wu
 Grafh
 Grand Daddy I.U.
 Grand Puba
 Grand Wizzard Theodore
 Grandmaster Caz
 Grandmaster Flash
 Grandmaster Flash and the Furious Five
 Grandwizard Theodore & the Fantastic Five
 Grap Luva
 Gravediggaz
 Group Home
 GZA

H
 Haas G
 Hak
 Hanz On
 Havoc
 Heavy D
 Heems
 Hell Razah
 Hell Rell
 Heltah Skeltah
 Hoodie Allen
 Homeboy Sandman
 The HRSMN
 Hurricane G

I
 Ilacoin
 Ill Al Skratch
 Ill Bill
 Immortal Technique
 Infamous Mobb
 InI
 Inspectah Deck
 Islord
 Issa Gold

J
 J-Live
 J-Zone
 J.R. Writer
 J57
 Ja Rule
 Jadakiss
 Jae Millz
 Jam Master Jay
 Janine Gordon
 Jared Evan
 Jarobi White
 Jay Critch
 Jay Z
 Jaz-O
 Jean Grae
 Jemini the Gifted One
 Jeru the Damaja
 Jesse West
 Jigmastas
 Jim Jones
 Jipsta
 Joe Budden
 Joell Ortiz
 Joey Bada$$
 JPEGMafia
 Juelz Santana
 Juice Crew
 Jumz
 Juggaknots
 Junglepussy
 Jungle Brothers
 Junior M.A.F.I.A.
 Just-Ice

K
 K-Solo
 K. Sparks
 K7
 Ka
 Kangol Kid
 Kastro
 Keith Murray
 Keith Shocklee
 Kid Capri
 Kid 'n Play
 Killa Sin
 Killah Priest
 Killarmy
 Kinetic 9
 Kirk Knight
 KMD
 Koncept
 Kool A.D.
 Kool DJ Herc
 Kool G Rap
 Kool Keith
 Kool Moe Dee
 Kovas
 KRS-One
 Kurious
 Kurtis Blow
 Kurtis Mantronik
 Kwamé
 Kyle Rapps

L
 The L.O.X.
 La Coka Nostra
 La the Darkman
 Lady Gaga
 Large Professor
 Leaders of the New School
 Le1f
 Lex "The Hex" Master
 Lil' Cease
 Lil' Kim
 Lil Mama
 Lil Peep
 Lin Que
 LL Cool J
 Lloyd Banks
 Loon
 Lord Finesse
 Lord Jamar
 Lord Tariq and Peter Gunz
 Lordz of Brooklyn
 Lost Boyz
 Louieville Sluggah
 Louis Logic
 Lovebug Starski
 Lumidee
 Lil Tecca
 Lil Tjay

M
 M.O.P.
 M-1
 Main Source
 Maino
 Mantronix
 Mariah Carey
 Marley Marl
 Mase
 Maseo
 Masta Ace
 Masta Ace Incorporated
 Masta Killa
 Mathematics
 Max B
 MC Jazzy Jeff
 MC Lyte
 MC Serch
 MC Shan
 MC Tee
 MCA
 McGruff
 Meechy Darko
 Melle Mel
 Memphis Bleek
 Method Man
 Meyhem Lauren
 MF Doom
 MF Grimm
 Mic Geronimo
 Michael Peace
 Mickey Factz
 Mike D
 Mims
 Mister Cee
 Mobb Deep
 Monsta Island Czars
 Mopreme Shakur
 Mos Def
 Mr. Cheeks
 Mr. Len
 Mr. Magic
 Mr. Muthafuckin' eXquire
 Mr. V
 Ms. Melodie
 Myzery

N
 N.O.R.E.
 Nas
 Native Tongues
 Nature
 Necro
 Never Yet Contested
 Newcleus
 Nice & Smooth
 Nicki Minaj
 Nine
 Nitty
 Njena Reddd Foxxx
 The Notorious B.I.G.
 NYOIL

O
 O.C.
 O.G.C.
 Ol' Dirty Bastard
 Omar Epps
 Onyx
 Organized Konfusion
 Overweight Pooch

P
 PackFM
 Papoose
 Paul C
 Pepa
 Percee P
 Pete Nice
 Pete Rock
 Pete Rock & CL Smooth
 Petey Pablo
 Pharoahe Monch
 Phife Dawg
 PMD
 Polyrhythm Addicts
 Pop Smoke
 Posdnuos
 Positive K
 Pras
 Prince Markie Dee
 Prince Paul
 Prince Po
 Pro Era
 Prodigal Sunn
 Prodigy
 Professor Griff
 Professor X the Overseer
 Prospect
 Public Enemy
 Pumpkinhead

Q
 Q-Tip
 Q-Unique
 Queen Pen

R
 R.A. the Rugged Man
 Ra Diggs
 Raekwon
 Rahzel
 Rakim
 Rammellzee
 Rampage
 Ratking
 Rayne Storm
 Rebel Diaz
 Red Café
 Redrum
 Reek da Villian
 Remedy
 Remy Ma
 Representativz
 Rich The Kid
 Rob Base and DJ E-Z Rock
 Rob Sonic
 Rob Swift
 Roc Marciano
 Roc Raida
 Rock
 Ron Browz
 Roxanne Shanté
 Royal Flush
 Rev. Run
 Run-D.M.C.
 Ruste Juxx
 RZA

S
 Sabor Latino
 Sadat X
 Saigon
 Salt
 Salt-N-Pepa
 Sammus
 Sauce Money
 Saul Williams
 Scott La Rock
 Sean Combs
 Sean Price
 Sean Slaughter
 Sensational
 Sensato del Patio
 Sha Stimuli
 Shabaam Sahdeeq
 Shabazz the Disciple
 Shawn Pen
 Sheek Louch
 Shock G
 Showbiz and A.G.
 Shyheim
 Shyne
 Silkski
 Sirah
 Sister Souljah
 Skizzy Mars
 Skyzoo
 Slick Rick
 Smif-n-Wessun
 Smoke DZA
 Smokin' Suckaz wit Logic
 Smoothe da Hustler
 Sonny Seeza
 Special Ed
 Special K
 Spliff Star
 Spoonie Gee
 Spot
 Spyder-D
 Starang Wondah
 Steele
 Stetsasonic
 Sticky Fingaz
 Streetlife
 Street Smartz
 Stretch
 Stro
 Styles P
 Sunz of Man
 Supernatural
 Supreme
 Sutter Kain
 Sweet Tee
 Swizz Beatz

T
 T La Rock
 Talib Kweli
 Tek
 Terminator X
 Terror Squad
 The Notorious B.I.G
 Theodore Unit
 Theophilus London
 Tim Dog
 Timbo King
 Tony Sunshine
 Tony Touch
 Tony Yayo
 Too Poetic
 Top Dog
 Top Quality
 Torae
 Torch
 Tragedy Khadafi
 Treacherous Three
 Trife Diesel
 Trigga the Gambler
 Tristan Wilds
 Troy Ave
 Tru-Life
 Trugoy
 Tryfle

U
 U-God
 Ultramagnetic MCs
 UMC's
 Uncle Murda
 The Underachievers
 UTFO
 Uncle Louie

V
 Vado
 Vast Aire
 Vinny Cha$e
 Vordul Mega

W
 Warp 9
 The Weathermen
 Whodini
 Wise
 Wonder Mike
 Wu-Elements
 Wu-Tang Clan

X
 The X-Ecutioners
 X Clan

Y
 Yak Ballz
 YC the Cynic
 YG'z
 Young Black Teenagers
 Young M.A
 Young MC
 Your Old Droog

Z
 Zebra Katz
 Zombie Juice

References

See also

 List of people from New York City
 List of hip-hop musicians

 New York City 
Hip hop musicians from New York City
New York City
 
Hip hop musicians